The Hungarian women's national under 18 ice hockey team is the national under-18 ice hockey team in Hungary. The team represented Hungary at the International Ice Hockey Federation's 2012 IIHF World Women's U18 Championship - Division I - Qualifications and at the Division I - Final tournament.

Women's World U18 Championship record

*Includes one win in extra time (in the preliminary round)
^Includes one loss in extra time (in the preliminary round)

Team

Current roster
Roster for the 2023 IIHF World Women's U18 Championship Division I Group A, played 9 to 15 January 2023 in Ritten, Italy.

Head coach: Botond BedőAssistant coaches: Martin Pillók, Máté Pukli

References

under
Women's national under-18 ice hockey teams